Dmytro Ivanovych Kuleba (born 19 April 1981) is a Ukrainian politician, diplomat, and communications specialist, currently serving as Minister of Foreign Affairs. He is also concurrently a member of the National Defense and Security Council of Ukraine. 

Kuleba is one of the youngest senior-diplomats in Ukraine's history. He previously worked as Deputy Prime Minister of Ukraine for European and Euro-Atlantic Integration as well as Permanent Representative of Ukraine to the Council of Europe between 2016 and 2019.

Biography

Kuleba was born on April 19, 1981 in Ukraine's eastern city of Sumy, then part of the Soviet Union. In 2003, he graduated with honors with a degree in International Law from the Institute of International Relations of the Taras Shevchenko National University of Kyiv. Kuleba subsequently obtained a Candidate of Sciences degree (equivalent to PhD) in Law in 2006.

Kuleba has served in Ukraine's diplomatic service and the Ministry of Foreign Affairs since 2003. In 2013, he abandoned public service citing his disagreement with Ukraine's former president Viktor Yanukovych's course and chaired the UART Foundation for Cultural Diplomacy.

He took active part in the Euromaidan protests in 2013–2014.

At the height of the early stages of the Russian invasion of Ukraine in 2014, Kuleba decided to return to the Ministry of Foreign Affairs as Ambassador-at-Large to launch strategic communications. He introduced the concepts of digital diplomacy, strategic communications, cultural diplomacy and public diplomacy into the Ministry’s work.

In 2016, Kuleba was appointed Permanent Representative of Ukraine to the Council of Europe. From August 2019 to March 2020, he was Deputy Prime Minister on matters of European relations. He has served as Minister of Foreign Affairs since 4 March 2020.

On 10 May 2022, Kuleba said that "In the first months" of the 2022 Russian invasion of Ukraine "the victory for us looked like withdrawal of Russian forces to the positions they occupied before February 24 and payment for inflicted damage. Now if we are strong enough on the military front and we win the battle for Donbas, which will be crucial for the following dynamics of the war, of course the victory for us in this war will be the liberation of the rest of our territories", including Donbas and Crimea. He called Russian president Vladimir Putin a "war criminal".

After Putin announced a partial mobilization of Russia's armed forces and referenced a potential use of nuclear weapons, Kuleba said that "Putin has shown utter disrespect to China, India, Mexico, Turkey, other Asian, African, Middle Eastern, Latin American nations which have called for diplomacy and an end to Russia's war on Ukraine."

On 10 October 2022, he urged African states to abandon their neutrality and condemn Russia's invasion of Ukraine. On 28 October 2022, he demanded the immediate cessation of the supply of Iranian weapons to Russia, including Iranian kamikaze drones. On 12 November 2022, he urged ASEAN countries to abandon their neutrality and support Ukraine.

In a December 2022 interview with the Associated Press, Kuleba called for a February 2023 peace summit at the United Nations mediated by secretary-general António Guterres, only inviting Russia if it faces an international court for war crimes.

He criticized India for profiting from buying cheap Russian oil. On 29 December 2022, following the strikes against Ukrainian infrastructure, Kuleba tweeted, "There can be no ‘neutrality’ in the face of such mass war crimes. Pretending to be ‘neutral’ equals taking Russia’s side."

Political views 
Dmytro Kuleba is a consistent supporter of Ukraine joining the EU and NATO. He is also in favor of providing Ukraine with an Action Program on NATO membership. In his opinion, Ukraine will join the North Atlantic Alliance earlier than the European Union.

Kuleba has repeatedly noted that Ukrainian identity is Central European, and he considers the deepening of relations and integration with neighboring countries in Central Europe to be one of the priorities of foreign policy.

Kuleba was a guest on the American talk show The Late Show with Stephen Colbert on 22 September 2022. He explained the position of the Ukrainian people: "We know how to win. And we will".

Personal life
He wrote a bestseller book The War for Reality. How to Win in the World of Fakes, Truths and Communities (2019) on modern communications, media literacy, and countering disinformation. In December 2017, Kuleba was named the best Ukrainian ambassador of the Year 2017 by the Institute of World Policy.

Family
Kuleba's mother is Yevhenia Kuleba. His father Ivan Kuleba is a career diplomat, a former Deputy Minister of Foreign Affairs of Ukraine (2003–2004), as well as Ukraine's ambassador to Egypt (1997–2000), Czech Republic (2004–2009), Kazakhstan (2008–2019), and Armenia (2019–2021).  

Kuleba is married and has two children. 

Kuleba's wife Yevhenia was number 1 on the party list for the Kyiv City Council of the party Servant of the People in the 2020 Kyiv local election on October 25, 2020. She is a Kyiv City Council Deputy, Secretary of the Kyiv City Council Standing Committee on Environmental Policy.

Awards and honors
:
 Order of Merit, 3rd class (2021)

:
 Grand Commander of the Order for Merits to Lithuania (2022)

See also
Honcharuk Government
Shmyhal Government
List of foreign ministers in 2020
List of foreign ministers in 2021
List of foreign ministers in 2022
List of current foreign ministers

References

External links

Honcharuk’s government: who joined the Cabinet of Ministers? 
Meet the Ministers: What We Know About Ukraine’s New Cabinet, Hromadske.TV

Taras Shevchenko National University of Kyiv, Institute of International Relations alumni
1981 births
Living people
Vice Prime Ministers of Ukraine
Politicians from Sumy
21st-century diplomats
Servant of the People (political party) politicians
Foreign ministers of Ukraine
European integration ministers of Ukraine
Permanent Representatives of Ukraine to the Council of Europe
National Security and Defense Council of Ukraine
Recipients of the Order of Merit (Ukraine), 3rd class
Commander's Grand Crosses of the Order for Merits to Lithuania